Schizotus is a genus of fire-colored beetles in the family Pyrochroidae. There are at least three described species in Schizotus.

Species
These three species belong to the genus Schizotus:
 Schizotus cervicalis Newman, 1838 g b
 Schizotus fuscicollis (Mannerheim, 1852) g b
 Schizotus pectinicornis (Linnaeus, 1758) g
Data sources: i = ITIS, c = Catalogue of Life, g = GBIF, b = Bugguide.net

References

Further reading

External links

 

Pyrochroidae
Taxa named by Edward Newman
Tenebrionoidea genera